The arrondissement of Bagnères-de-Bigorre is an arrondissement of France in the Hautes-Pyrénées department in the Occitanie region. It has 170 communes.

Composition

The communes of the arrondissement of Bagnères-de-Bigorre, and their INSEE codes, are:

 Adervielle-Pouchergues (65003)
 Ancizan (65006)
 Anères (65009)
 Anla (65012)
 Antichan (65014)
 Antist (65016)
 Aragnouet (65017)
 Ardengost (65023)
 Argelès-Bagnères (65024)
 Arné (65028)
 Arreau (65031)
 Arrodets (65034)
 Artiguemy (65037)
 Aspin-Aure (65039)
 Asque (65041)
 Asté (65042)
 Astugue (65043)
 Aulon (65046)
 Avajan (65050)
 Aventignan (65051)
 Aveux (65053)
 Avezac-Prat-Lahitte (65054)
 Azet (65058)
 Bagnères-de-Bigorre (65059)
 Banios (65060)
 Bareilles (65064)
 Barrancoueu (65066)
 La Barthe-de-Neste (65069)
 Batsère (65071)
 Bazus-Aure (65075)
 Bazus-Neste (65076)
 Beaudéan (65078)
 Benqué-Molère (65081)
 Bertren (65087)
 Bettes (65091)
 Beyrède-Jumet-Camous (65092)
 Bize (65093)
 Bizous (65094)
 Bonnemazon (65096)
 Bonrepos (65097)
 Bordères-Louron (65099)
 Bourg-de-Bigorre (65105)
 Bourisp (65106)
 Bramevaque (65109)
 Bulan (65111)
 Cadéac (65116)
 Cadeilhan-Trachère (65117)
 Campan (65123)
 Camparan (65124)
 Campistrous (65125)
 Cantaous (65482)
 Capvern (65127)
 Castelbajac (65128)
 Castillon (65135)
 Cazarilh (65139)
 Cazaux-Debat (65140)
 Cazaux-Fréchet-Anéran-Camors (65141)
 Chelle-Spou (65143)
 Cieutat (65147)
 Clarens (65150)
 Créchets (65154)
 Ens (65157)
 Esbareich (65158)
 Escala (65159)
 Esconnets (65162)
 Escots (65163)
 Esparros (65165)
 Espèche (65166)
 Espieilh (65167)
 Estarvielle (65171)
 Estensan (65172)
 Ferrère (65175)
 Fréchendets (65179)
 Fréchet-Aure (65180)
 Galan (65183)
 Galez (65184)
 Gaudent (65186)
 Gazave (65190)
 Gembrie (65193)
 Générest (65194)
 Génos (65195)
 Gerde (65198)
 Germ (65199)
 Gouaux (65205)
 Gourgue (65207)
 Grailhen (65208)
 Grézian (65209)
 Guchan (65211)
 Guchen (65212)
 Hauban (65216)
 Hautaget (65217)
 Hèches (65218)
 Hiis (65221)
 Houeydets (65224)
 Ilhet (65228)
 Ilheu (65229)
 Izaourt (65230)
 Izaux (65231)
 Jézeau (65234)
 Labassère (65238)
 Labastide (65239)
 Laborde (65241)
 Lagrange (65245)
 Lançon (65255)
 Lannemezan (65258)
 Libaros (65274)
 Lies (65275)
 Lombrès (65277)
 Lomné (65278)
 Lortet (65279)
 Loudenvielle (65282)
 Loudervielle (65283)
 Loures-Barousse (65287)
 Lutilhous (65294)
 Marsas (65300)
 Mauléon-Barousse (65305)
 Mauvezin (65306)
 Mazères-de-Neste (65307)
 Mazouau (65309)
 Mérilheu (65310)
 Mont (65317)
 Montastruc (65318)
 Montégut (65319)
 Montgaillard (65320)
 Montoussé (65322)
 Montsérié (65323)
 Nestier (65327)
 Neuilh (65328)
 Nistos (65329)
 Ordizan (65335)
 Orignac (65338)
 Ourde (65347)
 Pailhac (65354)
 Péré (65356)
 Pinas (65363)
 Pouzac (65370)
 Recurt (65376)
 Réjaumont (65377)
 Ris (65379)
 Sabarros (65381)
 Sacoué (65382)
 Sailhan (65384)
 Saint-Arroman (65385)
 Sainte-Marie (65391)
 Saint-Lary-Soulan (65388)
 Saint-Laurent-de-Neste (65389)
 Saint-Paul (65394)
 Saléchan (65398)
 Samuran (65402)
 Sarlabous (65405)
 Sarp (65407)
 Sarrancolin (65408)
 Seich (65416)
 Sentous (65419)
 Siradan (65427)
 Sost (65431)
 Tajan (65437)
 Thèbe (65441)
 Tibiran-Jaunac (65444)
 Tilhouse (65445)
 Tournous-Devant (65449)
 Tramezaïgues (65450)
 Trébons (65451)
 Troubat (65453)
 Tuzaguet (65455)
 Uglas (65456)
 Uzer (65459)
 Vielle-Aure (65465)
 Vielle-Louron (65466)
 Vignec (65471)

History

The arrondissement of Bagnères-de-Bigorre was created in 1800. In January 2017 it gained 13 communes from the arrondissement of Tarbes.

As a result of the reorganisation of the cantons of France which came into effect in 2015, the borders of the cantons are no longer related to the borders of the arrondissements. The cantons of the arrondissement of Bagnères-de-Bigorre were, as of January 2015:

 Arreau
 Bagnères-de-Bigorre
 La Barthe-de-Neste
 Bordères-Louron
 Campan
 Lannemezan
 Mauléon-Barousse
 Saint-Laurent-de-Neste
 Vielle-Aure

References

Bagneres-de-Bigorre